This is a round-up of the 1989 Mayo Senior Football Championship. Though events elsewhere dominated the Mayo GAA scene in this year, when the Championship was eventually concluded Knockmore were back as champions, after a five-year wait. Their final opponents, Kiltane, were making their first ever final appearance, and missed out on success narrowly.

First round

Quarter finals

Semi-finals

Mayo Senior Football Championship Final

References
Western People, Co. Mayo (Summer/Autumn 1989).

External links

Mayo Senior Football Championship
1989